Sam Edwards Adams Sr. (September 20, 1948 – October 10, 2015) was a professional American football offensive guard with the New England Patriots (1972–1980) and the New Orleans Saints (1981) of the National Football League. He played college football at Prairie View A&M University. He was a member of the New England Patriots 1970s All-Decade Team and 35th Anniversary Team.

Adams died at Methodist Willowbrook Hospital in Houston Texas on October 10, 2015 at the age of 67. He was the father of defensive tackle, Sam Adams. He is the uncle of safety Andrew Adams.

References

1948 births
2015 deaths
People from Jasper, Texas
American football offensive guards
Prairie View A&M Panthers football players
New England Patriots players
New Orleans Saints players